Caples Jefferson Architects is an American design and architecture firm founded in 1987 in New York City by principal architects Sara Caples and Everardo Jefferson. The firm focuses on 
architecture in a public, cultural & community context, and is unique for its dedication to designing approximately half of its projects in communities underserved by the design profession.

Biography

Sara Caples attended Smith College and received a Master of Architecture from Yale University. She has taught at schools of architecture at CCNY, Syracuse, and University of Miami. Everardo Jefferson attended Pratt Institute and received a Master of Architecture at Yale University. He has taught at schools of architecture at Columbia and Syracuse. Caples and Jefferson were invited to teach as the Louis I. Kahn Visiting Assistant Professors at Yale University in Fall 2015. In 2019, Jefferson was appointed Commissioner at the New York City Landmarks Preservation Commission.

The firm has garnered numerous awards, including the AIANY President's Award 2017, AIA New York State Firm of the Year in 2012, NYC MWBE Firm of the Year in 2009 and was a Mies van der Rohe Crown Hall Prize of the Americas nominee. Jefferson was the 2020 recipient of the Rowena Award, designated by the Rowena Reed Kostellow Fund at Pratt Institute.

Work

Caples Jefferson's body of work includes projects: Weeksville Heritage Center, Queens Theater in the Park addition and renovation, Marcus Garvey Community Center, Motion Pictures Editors Guild, Heritage Health & Housing Headquarters, Columbia University's Starr East Asian library renovation.

Weeksville Heritage Center  is a cultural center and urban design project that was completed in 2014 in Crown Heights, Brooklyn. The elegant new Modern structure is a two-story, 23,000 sq ft space that includes art exhibition, performance, education facilities, offices and green spaces for staff, visitors and the local community. The L shaped building frames the historic houses that once belonged to 19th African-American freedmen. It is certified LEED Gold, and includes geothermal wells, and storm water gathering and percolation on site. Weeksville Heritage Center has been awarded multiple awards, such as AIA New York State's Design Excellence Award 2014 & Best in New York State 2014, Municipal Art Society's Best New Building 2014, Historic Districts Council’s Design Award 2014, and Chicago Athenaeum's American Architecture Award 2014.

In The Architect Newspaper, Allen Blake notes that "Caples Jefferson has performed an art of architectural archeology, excavating, revealing and framing history through spatial expression. […] [Weeksville] is a visual and sensory interplay between past and present."

In 2010, Caples Jefferson Architects completed a 600 person reception room by the Queens Theatre in the Park, an addition to the 1964 New York World's Fair Site in Queens, New York. The project features a transparent "nebula room" which looks out upon the large observation towers surrounding it. "The 'transparent "nebula room' allows visitors to view the observatory towers...the reception room's festive atmosphere is created by the rich color palette derived from the area's culturally diverse surroundings." This project received several awards including the 2010 New York Construction Cultural Project of the Year, a Queens Chamber of Commerce Award, a National Organization of Minority Architects (NOMA) National Award of Excellence in Architecture as well as the 2011 MASterworks Award for Best Restoration by the Municipal Art Society.

Projects in construction or in design include: The Africa Center, Louis Armstrong House Museum, ongoing Columbia University projects, ongoing New York City School Construction Authority projects, and ongoing US Department of State projects.

Selected design and renovation projects
           
  
Museums
 The Africa Center, New York, NY 2020 (Projected) 
 Louis Armstrong Museum Center, New York, NY 2020 (Projected)
 Weeksville Heritage Center, Brooklyn, NY 2014

Educational Institutions
 10 Bouck Court Pre-Kindergarten, Brooklyn NY 2016 
 New York University, Faculty Housing, Bleecker Street, New York NY 2016 
 Columbia University Main Campus Scoping Documents, New York, NY 2014 (Projected)
 1337 Inwood Charter School, Bronx, NY 2015 (Projected)
 Marshak Science Building (HVAC upgrade), City College of New York, City University of New York, New York, NY (2012-2014 Projected)
 Life Sciences Building (upgrade), SUNY Stony Brook, New York, NY 2012 (Projected)
 Neighborhood Charter School of Harlem, New York, NY 2012
 Starr East Asian Library renovation, New York, NY 2009
 NYU Warren Weaver Cogen Plant, New York, NY 2004 (Masterplan)
 Hybrid School - Stephen Gaynor, New York, NY 2002 (Project)
 Grace Church School renovation, New York, 2002
 Child Care Center, Borough of Manhattan Community College, New York, 2002
 Howard Haber Blue Feather School interior design, Bronx, NY 1993
 Jennie Knauff Children’s Center, Bronx, NY 1991
         
Theatres
 Queens Theatre in the Park (addition of reception hall), Queens, NY 2009
 Apollo Theater (renovation), Harlem, New York 2002

Community centers
 Marcus Garvey Community Center, Brooklyn, NY 2011
 Cooper Park Community Center renovation, Brooklyn, NY 1997
 Taylor-Wythe Community Center renovation, Brooklyn, NY 1997
 Williamsburg Community Center, New York, NY 1997

Religious centers
 New Spirit Café (restaurant), New York, NY 2000

Treatment centers
 Central Harlem Alcohol Crisis Center, New York, NY 1995 (Project)

Urban design and infrastructure
 NYU Warren Weaver Cogen Plant preliminary design, New York, NY 2004 (Masterplan)
 Lehman Maintenance Building, New York, New York 1996

Offices
 Heritage Health and Housing HQ, New York, NY 2002
 DeSimone Consulting Engineers, New York, NY 1997
 Motion Picture Editors Guild (renovation), New York, NY 1999

Industrial
 Estee Lauder Cogeneration Plant, 2000 (Project)

Residential
 691 St. Nicholas Avenue, New York, NY  2016 (Projected)
 Intergen Senior Housing, Chicago, Illinois 2006 (Project)
 Three Generations House, New York, NY 1996
 Sutton Residence, New York, NY 1995
 Olivebridge, Olivebridge, NY 1991
 House in Vermont, Greensboro, VT 1975

Awards

 Rowena Award, Rowena Reed Kostellow Fund at Pratt Institute, 2020 
 AIA NY President's Award, 2017 
 The City of New York City Council Citation Weeksville Heritage Center, 2015 
 Built By Women New York City Award Weeksville Heritage Center, 2015 
 AIA NY COTE Institutional Award Weeksville Heritage Center, 2015 
 Chicago Atheneum American Architecture Award, 2014
 AIA New York State Best in New York State, 2014
 AIA New York State Design Award of Excellence, 2014
 MASterworks Award, Best New Building , Municipal Art Society, 2014
 Historic Districts Council, Design Award, 2014
 Mies van der Rohe Crown Hall Americas Prize Nominee, 2014
 Building Brooklyn Awards, Best New Civic/Institutional Building, 2014
 Architect Magazine Annual Design Review Best Cultural Project Citation, 2013 
 NOMA Honor Award for Excellence, 2013
 Architect Magazine Top 50 Sustainable Firms, 2013
 AIA New York State Firm of the Year, 2012 
 MASterworks Award for Best Restoration, Municipal Art Society, 2011 (Project)
 AIL Design Award with special citation Best Use of Color, 2011
 Cultural Project of the Year, New York Construction, 2010
 CWB Design Portfolio Award, 2010
 City of New York MWBE of the Year, 2009
 First Prize Award for Excellence in Design, Queens Chamber of Commerce, 2008
 NOMA National Awards for Excellence in Architecture, 2004, 2008, and 2009 
 NY Chapter AIA Design Awards Citations, 1995, 1996, 2006 and 2007
 New York City Art Commission Design Award, 2006
 NY Chapter AIA Honor Award for Architecture 2004
 AIA National Honor Award for Architecture, 2003
 New New York 3, Architectural League of New York, 2002
 Emerging Voice, Architectural League of New York, 1998

References

External links
 Official website

Architecture firms based in New York City
Design companies established in 1987
1987 establishments in New York City